is a Japanese novel by Naoto Asahara and illustrated by . The chapters were serialized on the website  from October 12 to October 28, 2016 before later receiving a print publication from Kadokawa. The novel follows Jun Andō, a gay high school student who befriends his classmate Sae Miura, a  who helps him become comfortable with his sexual identity.

Kanojo ga Suki na Mono wa Homo de Atte Boku de wa Nai received favorable reviews, and since its publication, it has received several adaptations. A 2021 live-action film titled  is slated for release in Q4 2021.

Plot

Jun Andō is a closeted gay high school student living in Tokyo, with the only people knowing about his sexuality being his boyfriend, Makoto, another closeted gay man who is married with children; Mr. Fahrenheit, his gay online friend and who shares his interest in Queen and is dating a man afflicted with HIV; and Kate, a lesbian and owner of Jun's favorite café. One day, Jun catches his classmate, Sae Miura, buying  manga. While Jun finds  to be offensive, as he believes it does not realistically portray the struggles of gay people, he agrees anyway.

As Jun and Miura grow closer, Miura confesses she has fallen in love with him during Golden Week. In an effort to try to live up to the expectations of society, Jun begins dating her, and despite his interest in her, he cannot bring himself to have sex. While discussing relationships with Mr. Fahrenheit, he reveals to Jun that his boyfriend died from AIDS last May; after their parents had discovered their relationship and that he had contracted HIV from him, they forbade them from meeting each other and he was denied the opportunity to attend his boyfriend's funeral. He makes Jun promise to return his copy of Queen II to his boyfriend's grave when he finally succumbs to AIDS. Following the conversation, Mr. Fahrenheit stops going online.

Jun suddenly receives a scheduled e-mail from Mr. Fahrenheit, who tells him that he is dying by suicide to be with his boyfriend. Distraught, Jun runs to Makoto, and Miura catches the two of them together, resulting in an argument. After reflecting, Jun decides to tell Miura the truth about his sexuality, but their classmate, Ono, overhears their conversation and mocks Jun, starting a fist fight. By the next school day, the entire class has found out about his sexuality. Overwhelmed, he attempts suicide by jumping from the school building.

Jun survives with a broken arm and is hospitalized for one month. After his mother learns about his sexuality, she vows to support him, and the two decide to move to Osaka. In addition, Miura and Jun's friend Ryōhei continue to visit him. Miura lends him her  manga, and as she begins to understand Jun more, she asks him to attend the end-of-term school assembly, where she will be given an award for her painting. As promised, Jun briefly attends amidst the hostility from his classmates. This causes the student body to cheer, and when the teachers attempt to silence her, Ono takes the microphone, also expressing his support for Jun. Jun gets up on the stage and kisses Miura.

Several days before Jun moves away, he visits Mr. Fahrenheit's house with Miura to pay respects and fulfill his promise, where he learns that Mr. Fahrenheit had lied about his age and was, in fact, a middle school student. At the end of the day, Miura breaks up with Jun to help the both of them move on. Realizing Makoto is unable to leave his family, Jun breaks up with him as well. On the final day, Jun goes to a gallery where Miura's painting is displayed, discovering that she had painted him and titled the painting "Falling in Love."

In the epilogue, Jun attends his new school in Osaka, with a positive outlook.

Characters

Jun is a closeted gay high school student. His favorite band is Queen. His parents gave birth to him when they were university students and divorced when he was young. He lives with his mother and has not seen his father in 10 years.

She asks Jun to keep this a secret, having lost her circle of friends in middle school after they discovered her hobby. As she gets to know Jun, she falls in love with him. After Jun reveals he is gay, she becomes understanding about his situation and is one of the only classmates who support him when the class turns against him. At the end of the novel, she breaks up with Jun to help the two of them move on with their lives.

Ryōhei is Jun's childhood friend. He is in love with Miura. After he learns that Jun is gay, he is one of the only classmates who support him when the class turns against him.

Makoto is Jun's boyfriend. Like Jun, Makoto is also secretly gay, but he keeps his sexual identity and relationship with Jun secret from his family. He is married with a daughter in middle school and a son who is around Jun's age. The two met after Jun responded to Makoto's dating post online, and per conditions given by Makoto, Jun calls him "father" during sex and believes he is being used to displace his lust for his son. Likewise, Jun believes he is attracted to Makoto because he did not have a father figure growing up. At the end of the novel, he ends their relationship, realizing that Makoto is unable to leave his family to be with him.

Mr. Fahrenheit is Jun's online friend, and Jun knows very little of his true identity. His username comes from the song "Don't Stop Me Now" by Queen, who is also his favorite band. Like Jun, he is also gay and dating a man at least a decade his senior. He runs a blog chronicling his relationship with his boyfriend, who is HIV positive. Jun becomes friends with Mr. Fahrenheit after finding his blog and continues asking him for advice. Mr. Fahrenheit later reveals he is HIV positive, having contracted it from his boyfriend. Following his boyfriend's death, he confesses to Jun that his boyfriend is cousin, and that after their parents discovered their relationship and illness, they forbade them to contact each other and he was not allowed to attend his funeral. He asks Jun to return Queen II to his boyfriend's grave when he eventually succumbs to AIDS. However, Mr. Fahrenheit dies by suicide. When Jun visits his home to fulfill his promise, he learns that Mr. Fahrenheit lied about being an older man and was a middle school student at his time of death.

Ono is Jun's classmate and acts as the leader of the class.

Kate is the owner of the café named '39, where Jun frequents, and hails from England. She is lesbian. After recommending Queen's music to Jun, they have become his favorite band.

Imamiya is one of Jun's classmates and Miura's friend. She is in love with Ryōhei, but she accepts that he loves Miura.
Jun's mother

Jun's mother is a single mother who had him as a first-year university student and divorced her husband 10 years ago. After learning Jun is gay, she becomes extremely supportive of him.

Sakura is an older woman who is Miura's  friend.

Kondō is Sakura's boyfriend.

Media

Novel
Kanojo ga Suki na Mono wa Homo de Atte Boku de wa Nai is written by Naoto Asahara. It was serialized on the website  from October 12 to October 28, 2016.

In an interview with Kadokawa, Asahara mentioned some parts of the novel were based on his personal experiences, such as self-loathing. He had not intended to write the novel as a commentary on LGBT issues and society, but that he had wanted to depict a young gay person in present time with focus on human emotions.

Television drama

A live-action television drama series adaptation titled  was announced on February 1, 2019, with  starring as Jun Andō. Additional cast members include  as Sae Miura, Yuki Ogoe as Ryōhei Takaoka,  as Yōko Andō (Jun's mother), and Shōsuke Tanihara as Makoto. It is directed by Makoto Bonkobara and Keisuke Oshima. The series was broadcast weekly on NHK on the  programming block beginning on April 20, 2019. Similar to the novel, the television drama series uses a motif based on Queen, Jun's favorite band, and all episodes are named after their songs. Producer Takuya Shimizu noted that the television drama adaptation had come after a string of live-action  series that had become popular in the recent years, as well as the release of Bohemian Rhapsody, but had insisted the timing was coincidental.

Manga

To accompany the 2019 television drama series adaptation, a manga adaptation written and illustrated by Akira Hirahara was published under the title of the original novel. The chapters were later released in three bound volumes by Kadokawa under the Bridge Comics imprint.

Film

A live-action television drama series adaptation titled  was announced on March 6, 2021, with  starring as Jun Andō. Tsubasa Imai was later cast as Makoto, Hayato Isomura as Mr. Fahrenheit,  as Hayato Kondō, Tōko Miura as Nao Sakura, and Sayaka Yamaguchi as Mizuki Andō (Jun's mother). The film is slated for a Q4 2021 release.

Reception

Novel

Nao Kawamoto from Da Vinci described the novel as "heart-wrenching" and "fresh", praising the realistic depictions of gay people in characters such as Jun, Makoto, and Mr. Fahrenheit.

Television series

Miho Suzuki from the Mainichi Shimbun noted that Fujoshi, Ukkari Gay ni Kokuru followed a wave of LGBT television series broadcasting after the popularity of Ossan's Love and What Did You Eat Yesterday? Jin Kitamura from  reviewed the series favorably, but he also criticized how Mr. Fahrenheit and his boyfriend having HIV/AIDS used negative stereotypes of the disease and gay people. In an audience survey held by the magazine Confidence, Daichi Kaneko and Ryōko Fujino's acting received praise. The show won the Galaxy Award Monthly Award in July 2019. During the 16th , Kaneko won the Newcomer Award. At the same event, Fujino was also awarded for Best Supporting Actress and Naoyuki Miura was awarded for Best Script.

Notes

References

External links
 

Japanese novels adapted into films
Japanese novels adapted into television shows
Japanese LGBT novels
Japanese LGBT-related films
2010s LGBT novels
2018 LGBT-related literary works
2010s Japanese LGBT-related television series